Jay Glenn Miner (May 31, 1932 – June 20, 1994) was an American integrated circuit designer, known primarily for developing graphics and audio chips for the Atari 2600 and Atari 8-bit family and as the "father of the Amiga".

Early life
Jay Miner received his first formal electronics education after joining the U.S Coast Guard out of high school. Following his service he became a radio operator for the North Atlantic Weather Patrol who serviced meteorological duties on distant islands for three years. He returned to school to enroll in the  University of California at Berkeley, for which he received a BS in EECS in 1958, focusing on electronics design.

Career
Miner first became a chip designer when he joined General Microelectronics in 1964, playing a role in the design of the first calculator to use the MOS ICs, the Victor 3900. He then worked at the companies Standard MicroSystems and American Micro Systems, at the latter of which he contributed to the design of the MP944 microprocessor. Subsequently he co-founded Synertek in 1973, where he served as the company's primary chip designer. One of the company's earliest contracts would be creating CMOS chips for the Bulova Watch Company, but they quickly became a second source manufacturer for chips designed by other firms such as Intel, Rockwell, and MOS Technology.

Atari
Due to its manufacturing of the MOS Technology 65xx series of chips, Synertek was recommended as a partner to Atari, Inc. after it had been decided to use the MOS 6507 for their upcoming Atari VCS home video game console. One of Atari's engineers, Harold Lee, had worked with Miner at Standard MicroSystems and suggested him as the designer for a custom chip which would power Atari's new console. Through an arrangement with Synertek, Atari hired Miner in late 1975 to lead the chip design for the Atari VCS, primarily that of the display hardware, the TIA.

Miner was also the designer on the follow-up technology intended for a successor console to the Atari VCS. The ANTIC and CTIA were created with enhanced capabilities compared to the TIA but the project was altered from a video game console into what would become the Atari 8-bit family of home computers. Due to clashes with management over this and other decisions, Miner left Atari before the release of the computers and found his way into the medical world. He worked for a company called Zymos Corporation and received two patents for a microprocessor-driven pacemaker made into a product by the company Intermedics Inc. called Cosmos.

Amiga

In 1982, Miner was approached by Larry Kaplan, former console programmer at Atari, about starting a new company to create a video game hardware without the oversight of a large corporation. They would become two of the co-founders of the company Hi-Toro (eventually renamed Amiga Corporation), where Miner headed the development of a chipset called Lorraine. The company entered financial straits which led it first into a temporary deal with Atari, Inc. and then acquisition by Commodore International. The Amiga computer was released in 1985 and, though not successful in mass market penetration, gained a devoted following among specialized users and computer game players.

Miner continued to work for Amiga Corporation as a subsidiary of Commodore but once again grew frustrated with the management style of the company. His frustrations largely revolved around what he said was Commodore marketing executives' failure to penetrate the Amiga into the low cost computer market. He left to work as a consultant for the company sometime after 1988, during which time he would appear at various Amiga shows and user group meetings. Among the Amiga users he was known as "Padre" or "the father of the Amiga", recognized for his contributions to the power of the machine.

Miner's last electronics job was at the company Ventritex, operating medical instrumentation and designing chips which controlled a cardiac defibrillator.

Personal life

Miner married his wife Carolina (née Poplowski) in 1951 while attending an electronics school in Groton, Connecticut. His dog Mitchy, a cockapoo, accompanied him everywhere. While he worked at Atari, Mitchy even had her own employee ID badge with number 000, and an embossing of her paw print is inside the Amiga 1000 top cover, alongside staff signatures.

Miner's personal hobbies included cultivating bonsai trees, square dancing, and camping. He was a particular fan of flight simulators on computers, having been significantly inspired to design Amiga as an excellent flight simulator. He said at one time his favorite Amiga program was the game F/A-18 Interceptor published by Electronic Arts in 1988.

He endured kidney problems for most of his life, according to his wife, and relied on dialysis. His sister, Joyce Beers, donated a kidney to him in 1990. He died due to complications from kidney failure at the age of 62.

References

External links

 Jay Miner Society
 Amiga Forever Premium Edition and Amiga Forever Video Edition, Cloanto IT srl. A DVD set featuring Jay Miner in several interviews and speeches.
 History of the Amiga, Ars Technica Amiga article series.

1932 births
1994 deaths
20th-century American engineers
American computer businesspeople
American electrical engineers
Amiga people
Atari people
Deaths from kidney failure
University of California, Berkeley alumni